The 2014 Taroii Open de Tênis was a professional tennis tournament played on clay courts. It was the second edition of the tournament which was part of the 2014 ATP Challenger Tour. It took place in Itajaí, Brazil between 7 and 13 April 2013.

Singles main-draw entrants

Seeds

Other entrants
The following players received wildcards into the singles main draw:
  Tiago Fernandes
  João Souza
  Joáo Walendowsky
  Eduardo Russi

The following players received entry from the qualifying draw:
  Fabrício Neis
  Thales Turini
  Eduardo Schwank
  Bruno Sant'anna

Doubles main-draw entrants

Seeds

Other entrants
The following pairs received wildcards into the doubles main draw:
  Eduardo Dischinger /  Eduardo Russi
  Tiago Fernandes /  Bruno Sant'anna
  Guilherme Galvão /  Leonardo Kirche

Champions

Singles

 Facundo Argüello def.  Diego Sebastián Schwartzman, 4–6, 6–0, 6–4

Doubles

 Máximo González /  Eduardo Schwank def.  André Sá /  João Souza, 6–2, 6–3

External links
Official Website

Taroii Open de Tenis
Taroii Open de Tênis